Malo-Bishkurayevo (Kese Bişquray) is a rural locality (a village) in Bishkurayevsky Selsoviet, Ilishevsky District, Bashkortostan, Russia. The population was 169 as of 2010. There are 3 streets.

Geography 
Malo-Bishkurayevo is located 30 km southeast of Verkhneyarkeyevo (the district's administrative centre) by road. Tyuliganovo is the nearest rural locality.

References 

Rural localities in Ilishevsky District